Kathleen Kennedy may refer to:

Kathleen Cavendish, Marchioness of Hartington (1920–1948), born Kathleen Kennedy, sister of U.S. President John F. Kennedy
Kathleen Kennedy (politician), maiden name of Kathleen Kennedy Townsend (born 1951), Maryland politician and daughter of Robert F. Kennedy
Kathleen Kennedy (producer) (born 1953), American film producer

See also
Kate Kennedy (disambiguation)